Josip "Joso" Bulat (born 18 March 1972) is a Croatian former professional footballer who played as a right back. He is currently working as the chairman of the Supervisory Board of Croatian football club HNK Šibenik since 2017.

His younger brother Ivan was a former footballer, and his son Marko is a professional footballer currently playing for HNK Šibenik.

International career
Bulat made his debut for Croatia in a June 1999 Korea Cup match against Mexico, the match remained his sole international appearance.

Honours

Player
Hajduk Split
Croatian Cup: 1999–2000

NK Zagreb
Croatian First League: 2001–02

Šibenik
Druga HNL (South): 2005–06

References

External links

1972 births
Living people
Sportspeople from Šibenik
Association football fullbacks
Croatian footballers
Croatia international footballers
HNK Šibenik players
HNK Hajduk Split players
NK Zagreb players
Bursaspor footballers
HNK Rijeka players
Qingdao Hainiu F.C. (1990) players
Croatian Football League players
First Football League (Croatia) players
Süper Lig players
Chinese Super League players
Croatian expatriate footballers
Expatriate footballers in Turkey
Croatian expatriate sportspeople in Turkey
Expatriate footballers in China
Croatian expatriate sportspeople in China